The Embassy of Spain in Moscow is the diplomatic mission of Spain in the Russian Federation. It is located at 50 Bolshaya Nikitskaya Street in the Presnensky District of Moscow.

See also 
 Russia–Spain relations
 Diplomatic missions in Russia

References

External links 
  Embassy of Spain in Moscow

Spain
Moscow
Russia–Spain relations
Soviet Union–Spain relations